Sarıveliler  is a village in Mut district of Mersin Province, Turkey. At  it is situated on the west bank of Göksu River. The population of the village was 357 as of 2012. Main economic activity is farming.

References 

Villages in Mut District